The Democratic Women's League of Germany (or DFD) was the mass women's organisation in East Germany.

It was established in March 1947 and had the following official aims:

Removal of fascist ideas
Education for women
Equal rights
Fair social living conditions
Education of children in the spirit of humanism and peace
Co-operation with the international women's movement

It was one of the members of the National Front and sent representatives to the Volkskammer. In 1988, membership was 1.5 million.

Chairwomen of the Democratic Women's League of Germany

References

External link

Political parties in East Germany
Women's wings of communist parties
Organisations based in East Germany
Organizations established in 1947
1947 establishments in Germany
Mass organisations of East Germany
Feminist organisations in Germany